Anna Weinzieher (born 14 September 1990 in Warsaw) is a Polish sports sailor. At the 2012 Summer Olympics, she competed in the Women's Laser Radial class, finishing in 22nd place.

References

Polish female sailors (sport)
Living people
Olympic sailors of Poland
Sailors at the 2012 Summer Olympics – Laser Radial
1990 births
Sportspeople from Warsaw